Sergey Logachev (born 18 February 1995) is a speedway rider from Russia. He currently rides in the Individual Speedway European Championship and finished in eighth place during the 2021 Speedway European Championship.

References 

Living people
1995 births
Russian speedway riders
People from Blagoveshchensk
Sportspeople from Amur Oblast